Louis Armstrong Plays W. C. Handy is a 1954 studio release by Louis Armstrong and His All Stars, described by Allmusic as "Louis Armstrong's finest record of the 1950s" and "essential music for all serious jazz collections". Columbia CD released the album on CD in 1986 in a much altered form, with alternative versions in place of many of the original songs, but restored the original with its 1997 re-issue, which also included additional tracks: a brief interview by the producer, George Avakian, with W. C. Handy; a joke told by Louis Armstrong; and several rehearsal versions of the songs.

Track listing

Side 1
 "St. Louis Blues" (Handy) - 8:50
 "Yellow Dog Blues" (Handy) - 4:16
 "Loveless Love" (Handy) - 4:28
 "Aunt Hagar's Blues" (Brymn, Handy) - 4:57
 "Long Gone (From The Bowlin' Green)" (Handy, Chris Smith) - 5:08

Side 2
 "The Memphis Blues (Or Mister Crump)" (Handy, George A. Norton) - 2:59
 "Beale Street Blues" (Handy) - 4:56
 "Ole Miss Blues" (Handy) - 3:25
 "Chantez Les Bas (Sing 'Em Low)" (Handy) - 4:48
 "Hesitating Blues" (Handy) - 5:20
 "Atlanta Blues (Make Me One Pallet on Your Floor)" (Dave Elman, Handy) - 4:33

1997 CD bonus tracks
 "George Avakian's Interview with W. C. Handy" - 2:44
 "Loveless Love [Rehearsal Sequence]" (Handy) - 5:55
 "Hesitating Blues [Rehearsal Sequence]" (Handy) - 5:38
 "Alligator Story" - 0:47
 "Long Gone (From The Bowlin' Green) [Rehearsal Sequence]" (Handy, Smith) - 7:53

Personnel
 Louis Armstrong – trumpet, vocals
 Trummy Young – trombone
 Barney Bigard – clarinet
 Billy Kyle – piano
 Arvell Shaw – double bass
 Barrett Deems – drums
 Velma Middleton – vocals

Production
George Avakian – producer, engineer, liner notes, reissue producer
Mark Wilder – engineer, digital mastering
Seth Rothstein – project director, project manager
Rene Arsenault – production assistant
Cozbi Sanchez-Cabrera – art direction, reissue art director
Steven Berkowitz – reissue series
Kevin Gore – reissue series
Randall Martin – reissue design

References

1954 albums
Louis Armstrong albums
Albums produced by George Avakian
Columbia Records albums